Bob Hilliard (born Hilliard Goldsmith; January 28, 1918 – February 1, 1971) was an American lyricist. He wrote the words  for the songs: "Alice in Wonderland", "In the Wee Small Hours of the Morning", "Any Day Now", "Dear Hearts and Gentle People", "Our Day Will Come", "My Little Corner of the World", "Tower of Strength" and "Seven Little Girls (Sitting in the Back Seat)".

Career
After finishing high school, Hilliard began working as a lyricist in Tin Pan Alley. At the age of 28 he had his first success with "The Coffee Song". During his Broadway years, Hilliard wrote successful scores for both Angel in the Wings (1947) and Hazel Flagg (1953). He also worked as lyricist of the film score for Alice in Wonderland (1951). This included providing the words to the theme song, as well as "I'm Late" and the unused Cheshire Cat song "I'm Odd." The 1954 comedy film Living It Up included his songs "Money Burns a Hole in My Pocket" and "That's What I Like."

Hilliard had later success as co-composer of the 1960s classic "Our Day Will Come." The song was a  No. 1 hit on the US Billboard Hot 100 chart in 1963 for Ruby & the Romantics.

In 1968, he also co-wrote "You Make Me Think About You" with Robert Mersey, the instrumental version of which was included in Doris Day's final film, With Six You Get Eggroll, but Doris Day did not sing the vocal version. That version was sung by Johnny Mathis. Mathis's single (arranged and conducted by Mersey) was released by Columbia Records. The single peaked at 35 on Billboards Easy Listening Chart.

Hilliard worked as lyricist and composer with a number of other composers and lyricists over the decades, including Burt Bacharach, Carl Sigman, Jule Styne, Mort Garson, Sammy Mysels, Dick Sanford (né Richard Young Sandford; 1896–1981), Milton DeLugg, Philip Springer, Lee Pockriss and Sammy Fain.

Death
Hilliard died of a heart attack at his Hollywood home on February 1, 1971, at the age of 53. He was survived by his wife, Jacqueline Dalya.

Awards and honors
Hilliard was posthumously inducted into the Songwriters Hall of Fame in 1983.

Song credits
Between the mid-1940s and the early 1960s, Hilliard co-wrote such hits as:

References

External links

Bob Hilliard at the Songwriters Hall of Fame

1918 births
1971 deaths
Songwriters from New York (state)
American lyricists
Jewish American songwriters
Musicians from New York City
Writers from New York City
20th-century American musicians
20th-century American Jews